The Aṇuvyākhyāna  is a magnum opus Sanskrit work in Dvaita philosophy written by Sri Madhvacharya. It is a metacommentary on the author's own commentary on the Brahma Sutras. The other three works on Sutras are 
Brahma Sutra Bhashya, Anu Bhashya and Nyayavivarana. Anuvyakyana is a work elucidating this commentary with scholarly and philosophical dissertations and criticisms of other schools especially Advaita of Adi Shankara and Vishistadvaita of Ramanuja.

Mentions and Commentaries

Commentaries
Sanyayaratnavali by Padmanabha Tirtha
Nyāya Sudhā, a magnum opus of Jayatirtha

References

Bibliography
 

Dvaita Vedanta
Philosophical literature
Sanskrit texts
Madhvacharya